Did Marco Polo Go to China? is a 1995 book, by Frances Wood, arguing that Italian explorer Marco Polo never visited China but travelled no further than Persia and that he based his description of China on accounts from Persian travelers.

The book notes that Polo failed to mention the Great Wall, the use of chopsticks as eating utensils, tea, foot-binding, Chinese calligraphy or other significant features and that there are no Chinese records of Polo's presence. Thus it is a typical example of an argument from silence.

Some archeologists have pointed to inconsistencies and inaccuracies in his description of Kublai Khan's attempted invasions of Japan in 1274 and 1281 and that Polo's account mixed up details from the two invasions.

Criticisms

A number of scholars have argued in favor of the established view that Polo was in China in response to Wood's book. The book has been criticized by figures including Igor de Rachewiltz (translator and annotator of The Secret History of the Mongols) and Morris Rossabi (author of Kublai Khan: his life and times).

Errors in Wood's book have been pointed out by various scholars. For example, Stephen G. Haw notes how Wood claims that the History of Yuan mentions Giovanni de Marignolli by name even though it mentions only the tributary gift that he brought to the Yuan court, a large impressive war horse given by the "Franks" (Fulang) of Europe.

The historian David Morgan also points out basic errors made such as confusing the Liao dynasty with the Jin dynasty, and he found no compelling evidence in the book that would convince him that Marco Polo did not go to China. Haw also argues in his book Marco Polo's China that Marco's account is much more correct and accurate than has often been supposed and that it is extremely unlikely that he could have obtained all the information in his book from second-hand sources. Haw also criticizes Wood's approach to finding mention of Marco Polo in Chinese texts by contending that contemporaneous Europeans had little regard for using surnames and that a direct Chinese transliteration of the name "Marco" ignores the possibility of him taking on a Chinese or even Mongol name with no bearing or similarity with his Latin name.

Reviewing Haw's book, Peter Jackson (author of The Mongols and the West) has said that Haw "must surely now have settled the controversy surrounding the historicity of Polo's visit to China". 
 
Igor de Rachewiltz's review, which refutes Wood's points, concludes with a strongly-worded condemnation: "I regret to say that F. W.'s book falls short of the standard of scholarship that one would expect in a work of this kind. Her book can only be described as deceptive, both in relation to the author and to the public at large. Questions are posted that, in the majority of cases, have already been answered satisfactorily ... her attempt is unprofessional; she is poorly equipped in the basic tools of the trade, i.e., adequate linguistic competence and research methodology ... and her major arguments cannot withstand close scrutiny. Her conclusion fails to consider all the evidence supporting Marco Polo's credibility."

References

1995 non-fiction books
Marco Polo
Historical revisionism